William Henry Brann (4 April 1899 – 22 September 1953) was a South African cricketer who played in three Test matches from 1922 to 1923.

References

1899 births
1953 deaths
South Africa Test cricketers
South African cricketers
Eastern Province cricketers